Strathavon is a suburb of Johannesburg, South Africa. It is located in Region E of the City of Johannesburg Metropolitan Municipality. Strathavon is a sought after area due to its convenient location and close proximity to the Sandton CBD, and the M1 motorway. The Chabad movement has a centre in Strathavon.

References

Johannesburg Region E